Attock Tehsil (in Punjabi and ) is one of the six tehsils of Attock District in the Punjab Province of Pakistan. The Indus River bounds it on the north-west, dividing it from the Khyber Pakhtunkhwa, while the Haro River flows through from east to west.

The north-west corner is occupied by the fertile Chach Valley. South of this lies a dry sandy plain, beyond which rises the Kala Chitta Range. The eastern half consists of the tract known as the Nala, which includes, along with a number of low hills and much broken country, a considerable area of fairly good level land, portions of which are irrigated from wells and by cuts from the Haro and other smaller streams.

The major language spoken in the tehsil is Hindko followed by Pashto.

History

The district according to the Imperial Gazetteer of India:

References

External links
www.attocknews.com
www.attockonians.com 

Tehsils in Attock District